Kazan Wildland Provincial Park is a wildland provincial park in northern Alberta, Canada. , Kazan is the largest park under Alberta provincial authority (Banff, Jasper, and Wood Buffalo National Parks are larger but are under federal authority). The park was initiated by and is contained in the Lower Athabasca Regional Plan Land Use Framework in August 2012. Two smaller parks, La Butte Creek and Colin-Cornwall Lakes Wildland Provincial Parks, were disestablished and incorporated into Kazan.

Location
The park is located in the far northeast corner of the province within the Regional Municipality of Wood Buffalo; to the north is Northwest Territories and east is Saskatchewan. It encompasses the majority of lands north of Lake Athabasca and east of Wood Buffalo National Park with Slave River and Rivière des Rochers forming the western boundary.

Ecology
The park is in the Kazan Uplands subregion of the Canadian Shield Natural Region.

See also
List of provincial parks in Alberta
List of Canadian provincial parks
List of National Parks of Canada

References

External links
 

Parks in Alberta
Regional Municipality of Wood Buffalo